Fernando Nicolás Cornejo Miranda (born 26 December 1995) is a Chilean footballer who plays for Palestino as a midfielder.

Career
He made his senior debut in Primera División for Cobreloa, on December 8, 2013, when he came on as a substitute in the second half against Universidad de Chile.

In November 2022, he joined Palestino for the 2023 season.

Personal life
He is the son of former Chile international footballer Fernando Cornejo Jiménez.

References

External links
 

1995 births
Living people
People from Rancagua
Chilean footballers
Cobreloa footballers
Audax Italiano footballers
Coquimbo Unido footballers
Universidad de Chile footballers
Club Deportivo Palestino footballers
Chilean Primera División players
Primera B de Chile players
Association football midfielders